Vincenzo Caprile (Naples, June 24, 1856 – Naples, 1936)  was an Italian painter, mainly Genre scenes and landscape paintings depicting the coast of Amalfi.

Biography
He studied at the Academy of Fine Arts of Naples with Domenico Morelli and Gabriele Smargiassi. He was attached to the School of Resina associated with Filippo Palizzi.

His seascape scenes depict the daily life of the area, and the rocks and beaches of Positano, Amalfi, Ravello and the Gulf of Salerno. Among his works are  La Fanciulla di Positano and the portrait of the owner of the Covo dei Saraceni.

 Along with other neapolitan impressionist painters, such as Luca Postiglione, Pietro Scoppetta, Vincenzo Volpe, Edoardo Matania, Attilio Pratella, Giuseppe Alberto Cocco, Giuseppe Casciaro, Giuseppe Chiarolanza, Gaetano Esposito, Vincenzo Migliaro, Vincenzo Irolli, he helped decorate the rooms of the Caffè Gambrinus in Naples.

Gallery

References

External links

1856 births
1936 deaths
19th-century Italian painters
Italian male painters
20th-century Italian painters
Painters from Naples
Italian genre painters
19th-century Italian male artists
20th-century Italian male artists